Anja Secrève (8 October 1917 – 14 November 2005) was a Dutch fencer. She competed in the women's individual foil event at the 1948 Summer Olympics. She won Dutch championships in women's foil in 1946, 1948, 1949 and 1951.

References

External links
 

1917 births
2005 deaths
Dutch female foil fencers
Olympic fencers of the Netherlands
Fencers at the 1948 Summer Olympics
Sportspeople from The Hague
20th-century Dutch women
20th-century Dutch people